Chelydrops is an extinct genus of Chelydridae from Miocene of North America. Only one species is described, Chelydrops stricta (Matthew, 1924).

The genus was considered by Hutchison (2008) to be a junior synonym of the genus Macrochelys, containing the alligator snapping turtle; Hutchison transferred the species C. stricta to the genus Macrochelys.

References

 Carroll, R. L. Vertebrate Paleontology and Evolution. W. H Freeman Company, 1988.

Chelydridae
Miocene turtles
Miocene reptiles of North America
Prehistoric turtle genera
Taxa named by Wilhelm Peters
Fossil taxa described in 1868